Events from the year 1998 in Russia.

Incumbents
President: Boris Yeltsin
Prime Minister: 
 until 23 March: Viktor Chernomyrdin 
 23 March-24 April: vacant
 24 April-23 August: Yevgeny Primakov
 23 August-11 September: vacant
 starting 11 September: Yevgeny Maximovich Primakov
Minister of Defence: Igor Sergeyev

Events

March
18 March - Kidnapping of Mormon missionaries in Saratov

August
17 August - 1998 Russian financial crisis

October
3 October - 1998 abduction of foreign engineers in Chechnya

Deaths
26 March - Nikolay Dubinin, biologist (b. 1907)
4 June - Lev Rokhlin, former army officer and Yeltsin critic, murdered (b. 1947)
8 June - Larisa Yudina, opposition journalist, assassinated (b. 1920)
23 August - Alexey Andreevich Anselm, physicist (b. 1934)
3 December - Albert Leman, composer (b. 1915)
23 December - Anatoly Rybakov, writer (b. 1911)

References

External links

 
1990s in Russia
Years of the 20th century in Russia
Russia
Russia
Russia